Paulo Bethencourt (born Paulo Bethencourt da Silva Franco Neto, in Rio de Janeiro, Brazil) is a multi-platinum, Grammy nominated music producer, composer and arranger, who has created original musical works for Sony Music International, Universal Music Group, Warner Music Group, BMG, and Discovery Channel.

Early life
Bethencourt was born in 1967, three years after the 1964 Brazilian coup d’état that spawned an authoritarian military regime that ruled Brazil from 1964 to 1985. Influenced by the rise of MPB (Música Popular Brasileira) - a musical style that borrows elements from Bossa Nova and characterized by the veiled lyric criticism of social injustice and governmental repression - he began his musical studies at the age of nine with piano instructor Ethel Sophia Galliza. Soon after, Bethencourt was introduced to Jazz and Bossa Nova by a neighbor, saxophonist Victor Assis Brasil, who performed alongside Chick Corea, Dizzy Gillespie, and Ron Carter. Later, encouraged by renown classical composer and conductor Edino Krieger, Bethencourt decided to pursue a musical career.

In 1989, Bethencourt became the first Brazilian citizen to be granted a sponsorship by the Brazilian government to study Jazz abroad, through incentives aimed at boosting cultural development after the fall of the dictatorship. He was accepted at Musicians Institute (MI) in Los Angeles, California, but lost his funding a few months short of the trip, when the newly elected - and later impeached - Fernando Collor de Mello assumed the presidency of the country in 1990, freezing personal assets of all Brazilian citizens and ending all federal cultural grants.

Bethencourt enrolled at Musiarte, a private music conservatory institution in Copacabana, Rio de Janeiro. He was granted full scholarship and graduated with honors two years later.

Cruise lines and Scala Miami
In 1991, Bethencourt moved to Miami, Florida. For the next twelve years, he worked as a music producer and composer for Royal Caribbean, Celebrity Cruises, Carnival Cruise Lines, Island Cruises, Premier Cruises, among others.

In October 27, 1993 - in partnership with Scala Rio, The Four Ambassadors Hotel and SMN Productions - Bethencourt opened Scala Miami, a dinner-show style theatre overlooking Miami's Biscayne Bay. Bethencourt received the Culture, Arts & Communication Award in May 2014 for the production of "Rio Ecstasy.” The same show opened a year later at the Oasis Hotel in Cancun, Mexico.

After the collapse of Premier Cruise Lines in 2000, followed by the 9/11 events, the suffering cruise line industry was forced to undergo dramatic changes and budget cuts. Bethencourt left the industry in order to focus on his recording career.

Record industry
In 1997, Bethencourt produced two award-winning projects with artists Barão Vermelho (BMG, Brazil) and Wyclef Jean (Sony Music, USA). His remix of Guantanamera was featured in over 20 compilations worldwide, becoming part of the TV series Baywatch by NBC, awarding Bethencourt with a RIAA's Double-Platinum Certification.

In 1999, Bethencourt was invited by Warner/Chappell’s Senior Vice President, Ellen Moraskie, to become an exclusive songwriting for the company, consequently receiving his second RIAA’s Platinum Album Certification in the U.S. with the album “Rivera", by the artist Jerry Rivera (Sony Music). Moraskie’s sudden death in 2003 had a profound impact on Bethencourt, who considered her a visionary music executive.

By the year 2000, Bethencourt was producing, composing and arranging albums in English, Spanish and Portuguese. With top-charting singles in Latin America by artists such as Fabio Junior (BMG), Wanessa Camargo (Sony/BMG), and Martin Ricca (Sony/BMG). As a producer in the album “Evolución” by the  artist Luis Enrique (Warner Music Group), Bethencourt received a nomination for the 43rd Grammy Awards by the Recording Industry Association of America.

In 2001, Bethencourt became the Artists and Repertoire (A&R) Director for Sony Music's Regional Strategic Marketing Department in Miami Beach, creating the successful joint venture between Sony Music, Telemundo/NBC and Rede Globo, for which he produced multiple award-winning soundtrack projects such as “El Clon”, “Puerto De Los Milagros”, "Uga-Uga”, “Vale Todo” and “Terra Nostra.”

By 2003, widespread copyright infringement in Latin America forced Sony Music to shut down its 605 Lincoln Road building and the strategic marketing regional office was closed. On that same year, Bethencourt founded and presided over Exit 12 Entertainment, second largest independent music-video distributor in Hispanic Latin America. After years of struggle against copyright infringement however, the company ceased to operate in 2007. Bethencourt moved to Los Angeles, California, resuming his career as a soundtrack composer until 2014, when he returned to Florida to assume the Vice Presidency of International Marketing & Sales for Lennar Homes, the second largest homebuilder in the United States.

References

External links
Luis Enrique regresa con 'Evolución'

Linkedin Page
Rosemax Discography
Warner/Chappell - Una Senal
Red Carpet Double Feature

Brazilian male musicians
Living people
Brazilian record producers
Brazilian male composers
A&R people
Year of birth missing (living people)